The greater flowerpiercer (Diglossa major) is a species of bird in the family Thraupidae. It is found in the tepuis of western Guyana, eastern Venezuela and far northern Brazil. Its natural habitats are subtropical or tropical moist montane forests and subtropical or tropical high-altitude shrubland.

Description
The adult has a black mask but is otherwise a bluish-slate colour, with a silvery moustachial streak and silvery streaks on the crown and mantle. It has a chestnut crissum (the area around the cloaca). It is unlikely to be confused with related species because no other members of the genus shares its range.

Distribution and habitat
The greater flowerpiercer occurs around the tepuis (flat-topped mountains) that are found in the southeastern part of Venezuela and the adjoining areas of northern Brazil, eastern Bolivia and western Guyana. Its altitudinal range is from  but it is most common above . It typically occurs in clearings and edges of montane forest, in shrubland and stunted woodland.

Ecology
This bird usually forages alone or in pairs, but sometimes joins small mixed species groups. It feeds on insects as well as nectar which it extracts by probing and piercing flowers. The nest is constructed of grasses and fine twigs and is cup-shaped. It is built among rocks, often under an overhang.

Status
The greater flowerpiercer has a somewhat restricted range but, although the population size has not been quantified, the trend is thought to be downwards because of the gradual decline in the quality of its habitat. The bird is described as being "fairly common but patchily distributed", and the International Union for Conservation of Nature has assessed its conservation status as being of "least concern".

References

greater flowerpiercer
Birds of the Tepuis
greater flowerpiercer
Taxonomy articles created by Polbot